José Medrano (born 16 May 1968) is a Bolivian footballer. He played in two matches for the Bolivia national football team in 1991. He was also part of Bolivia's squad for the 1991 Copa América tournament.

References

External links
 

1968 births
Living people
Bolivian footballers
Bolivia international footballers
Association football midfielders
Sportspeople from Santa Cruz de la Sierra